Masters of the Sun is a comic book series created by American musical group Black Eyed Peas. The first volume, The Zombie Chronicles, was published on August 31, 2017.

Plot
Masters of the Sun mixes L.A. gang culture, b-boy-ism and Egyptology to tell the tale of a hip-hop group from the Bronx who must battle an ancient, alien god set on controlling the Earth. While on tour in L.A., a zombie outbreak breaks loose when a drug manufactured by the aliens starts turning its users into zombies. The group narrowly escapes the initial outbreak and starts investigating what caused it. While initially hesitant, Lady Nix convinces them that unless they do something, the whole world is doomed. 

The story serves as an allegory for the crack epidemic of the 1980s, where the "soulless husk" zombies of the comic stand-in for the people addicted to crack-cocaine. The comic pushes the idea that the epidemic was not random happenstance, but a purposeful agenda orchestrated by the government to keep the black community down.

Main characters
Zulu X – A rising Hip-Hop star from the Bronx, Zulu X struggles to balance his gang-banger history with his inner morals. He is granted a pair of mystical goggles that let him see through lies and determine the truth of any situation.
Jimmy Guapo – A wanna be rapper, Jimmy encounters Zulu X and his band when he tries to give them his demo tape. A longtime friend of Lady Nix, in hard times Jimmy's true character shines through his brash demeanor. 
Lady Nix – Owner of the club where Zulu X is performing the night of the zombie outbreak. She took over the club after her father was gunned down by gang members. She believes gang culture is holding the black community back by forcing them to focus on infighting instead of the bigger picture. 
Big Ap – Zulu X's right-hand man and DJ. Big of stature and of heart, he can bring an element of fun to any situation.
Polo – Jimmy Guapo's best friend and hype man. He accompanies Jimmy everywhere.
Master Sun – An ancient, mysterious being that visits the Zulu X team aids them in their quest. He grants them ancient weapons and knowledge about the enemy they face.
Emeritis – Master Sun's bodyguard and trusted ally. 
Apep – An evil alien, he has been working for millennia to subjugate portions of the human race. He incites race tensions to keep people focused on fighting themselves so he can seize power.
Agent Hughes – A CIA agent investigating the zombie outbreak in LA.

Technology integration

In addition to the comic, the group also released Augmented and Virtual Reality companion applications. The AR app scans the pages and adds special effects and a full cast reading, while the VR app retells portions of the story in a 3D comic book world.

AR cast 
The AR app added a full cast reading of the comic, with characters being voiced by prominent Hip-hop artists and actors.
Narrator – Stan Lee
Master Sun –  Rakim
Polo –  Jaden Smith
Saleem – Jamie Foxx
Malik – Charlamagne Tha God
Lady Nix –  Queen Latifah
Big Ap – Common
Apep –   Jason Isaacs
Emeritis – Mary J Blige
Agent Hughes – Rosario Dawson
Secret Agent – Ice-T
DJ Eddie Flip – Slick Rick
Sonny – Raekwon
Jay Jay – Redman
Zulu X – KRS-One
Jimmy Guapo – Michael Rapaport
Tyrone –  Snoop Dogg
Amun Ra – John DiMaggio
Amari Jones – Flavor Flav

Editions

2017 comics debuts
Marvel Comics titles
Superhero comics
Black Eyed Peas